"San Antonio Stroll" is a song written by Peter Noah, and recorded by American country music artist Tanya Tucker.  It was released in August 1975 as the second single from the album Tanya Tucker. It was her fifth number one on the country chart.  The single stayed at number one for a single week and spent a total of eleven weeks on the country chart.

Chart performance

Cover versions
In 1976, Maury Finney recorded an instrumental version as the b-side to his single "Maiden's Prayer."

References

External links
 

1975 singles
1975 songs
Tanya Tucker songs
Song recordings produced by Snuff Garrett
Songs about cities in the United States
Songs about Texas
MCA Records singles